Kaloko-Honokōhau National Historical Park is a United States National Historical Park located in the Kona District on the Big island of Hawaii in the U.S. state of Hawaii.  It includes the National Historic Landmarked archaeological site known as the Honokōhau Settlement. The park was established on November 10, 1978, for the preservation, protection and interpretation of traditional native Hawaiian activities and culture.

History
Kaloko and Honokōhau are the names of two of the four different ahupuaa, or traditional mountain-to-sea land divisions encompassed by the park.  Although in ancient times this arid area of lava rock was called kekaha aole wai (lands without water), the abundant sea life attracted settlement for hundreds of years.

Kaloko
Kaloko (meaning "the pond" in the Hawaiian language) is a site of fishponds used in ancient Hawaii is on the North end of the park.
The first reference to the pond comes from the story of Kamalalawalu, about 300 years  ago.
The kuapā (seawall) is over 30 feet wide and 6 feet high, stretching for 750 feet. Constructed by hand without mortar, the angle and gaps between the stones deflected the surf better than many modern concrete seawalls.

Aimakapā fishpond is an important wetland area protecting native birds including the koloa maoli (Hawaiian duck, Anas wyvilliana), alae keokeo (Hawaiian coot, Fulica alai), āeo (Hawaiian stilt, Himantopus mexicanus knudseni), aukuu (black-crowned night heron, Nycticorax nycticorax), among others.
The area is currently under reforestation, after the removal of non-native invasive plants.

It was added to the Register of Historic Places in 1978.

Honokōhau
Honokōhau means "bay drawing dew" and refers to the ancient settlement
on the south part of the park.
This area can be reached via trails from the park visitor center, or from the small boat harbor access road on Kealakehe Parkway.
Features include loko ia (Ancient Hawaiian aquaculture fishponds), kahua (house site platforms), kii pōhaku (petroglyphs), hōlua (stone slides) and heiau (religious sites).
The Aiopio Fishtrap is a  pond, with a stone wall forming an artificial enclosure along the naturally curved shoreline of a bay.
Small openings allowed young fish to enter from the sea, but as they grew larger (or at low tide) they were easily caught with nets inside the trap as needed.
It was designated a National Historic Landmark in 1962, and was added to the National Register of Historic Places in 1966.

Recreation
Several restored trails include about one mile of the Māmalahoa Trail.
It was built in the mid-19th century, and evolved over the years into the Hawaii Belt Road which encircles the entire island.
The coastal trail is part of the Ala Kahakai National Historic Trail.
The Honokōhau boat harbor provides a launching area for traditional canoes, fishing boats, Scuba diving and snorkeling tours of the area.

Gallery

References

External links

 

History of Hawaii (island)
Kailua-Kona, Hawaii
National Park Service areas in Hawaii
Wetlands of Hawaii
Hawaii-KAHO
Hawaii culture
National Historical Parks of the United States
National Historic Landmarks in Hawaii
Archaeological sites on the National Register of Historic Places in Hawaii
Protected areas established in 1978
Protected areas of Hawaii (island)
Landforms of Hawaii (island)
1978 establishments in Hawaii
Beaches of Hawaii (island)
National Register of Historic Places in Hawaii County, Hawaii
Parks on the National Register of Historic Places in Hawaii